Calliostoma hedleyi is a species of sea snail, a marine gastropod mollusk in the family Calliostomatidae.

Some authors place this taxon in the subgenus Calliostoma (Fautor).

Description
The size of the shell varies between 7 mm and 17 mm.

Distribution
This marine species occurs in Australian waters off Victoria, Tasmania and Western Australia

References

 Cotton, B.C., 1959. South Australian Mollusca. Archaeogastropoda.  Govt. Printer, Adelaide. 1-449
 Macpherson, J.H. & Gabriel, C.J., 1962. Marine Molluscs of Victoria. Melbourne University Press and National Museum of Victoria, Melbourne. xv, 475
 Wilson, B. (1993). Australian Marine Shells. Prosobranch Gastropods. Kallaroo, WA : Odyssey Publishing. Vol.1 1st Edn pp. 1–408.

External links
 

hedleyi
Gastropods described in 1902